Richard J. Barwegen (December 25, 1921 – September 3, 1966) was an American professional football player who was an offensive lineman for five seasons in the National Football League (NFL). He was selected to four Pro Bowls during his career. He is one of only four members of the NFL 1950s All-Decade Team to not be in the Pro Football Hall of Fame.  The Professional  Football Researchers Association named Barwegan to the PRFA Hall of Very Good Class of 2008

Career
Barwegen was drafted late in the 1945 NFL Draft by the Brooklyn Tigers, who soon merged with the Boston Yanks, though he never played a down with them, playing with the AAFC New York Yankees before playing for the first incarnation of the Baltimore Colts for two seasons, long enough for them to join the NFL. But Barwegen was traded by Abe Watner to the Bears for George Blanda, Bob Perina, Ernie Zalejski, Jimmy "Tank" Crawford, and Bob Jensen. After three seasons with the Bears, he played with the new incarnation of the Baltimore Colts in their first season and went to his fourth straight Pro Bowl, his last. After one more season with the Colts, he left to play with the Ottawa Rough Riders, before retiring. Barwegan was 2nd Team AAFC All Pro in 1947, consensus 1st Team AAFC All Pro in 1948 and 1949, consensus 1st Team NFL All Pro in 1950 and 1951, and 2nd Team NFL All Pro in 1952.

References

External links
 

1921 births
1966 deaths
American football offensive guards
Baltimore Colts players
Baltimore Colts (1947–1950) players
Canadian football offensive linemen
Chicago Bears players
New York Yankees (AAFC) players
Ottawa Rough Riders players
Purdue Boilermakers football players
Western Conference Pro Bowl players
Players of American football from Chicago